Wanniaarachchige Don David Victor Jayamanne, MBE (15 February 1915 – 25 July 1981), popularly known as Eddie Jayamanne was a popular Sri Lankan comedian and actor of early Sri Lankan cinema.

Early life
He was born on 15 February 1915 in Periyamulla, Negambo to a Christian family as the youngest of the family with seven siblings. His father, W. Don Thomas was a teacher at Maris Stella College. He was educated at the Cross College of Negombo, St. Peter's College, Negombo, St. Mary's College, Negombo and Maris Stella College. His elder brother B. A. W. Jayamanne was a renowned filmmaker and producer.

Eddie married fellow Minerva troupe player Rukmani Devi after falling in love through their involvement in the same plays. Devi's parents challenged their engagement in court but they were allowed to go through with their marriage.

Cinema career
Eddie with his brother B. A. W. Jayamanne formed the Minerva theater troupe in the 1930s. They successfully ran plays in which naive Ceylonese characters would ape Western ways to comical results merging South Indian theatre with Western drama. Eddie, a frequent star of these comedies, became a popular theater actor in the years leading up to the development of Sri Lankan cinema.

In 1947, South Indian producer S. M. Nayagam became interested in producing a Sri Lankan film. He contacted B. A. W. Jayamanne and secured the rights to one of his plays called Kadawunu Poronduwa. Eddie would be one of the stars in this film adaption in the village simpleton role of "Manappuwa" alongside Jemini Kantha as Josi Baba. As the first film to feature Sinhalese dialogue, the film found approval with audiences and was a huge success.

The Jayamanne brothers followed the success of the film with several other play adaptions i.e. Hadisi Vinishchaya (1949), Sengawunu Pilithura (1951) and Umathu Wishwasaya (1952). Mabel Blythe joined the cast with Hadisi Vinishchaya. In 1953 the brothers adapted a book into film for the first time in Sri Lankan cinema (Kele Handa). Their subsequent films include Iranganie (1954), Matha Bedhaya (1955), Perakadoru Bena (1955), Daiwa Wipaakaya (1956), Vanaliya (1958),  Kawata Andare (1960) and Mangalika (1963).

Eddie's work not related to his brother's productions include playing a musician in Sandesaya (1960) and the brother of a village simpleton who discovers a jewel and becomes rich in Kolomba Sanniya (1976). He reprised his role as Manappuwa in a remake of Kadawunu Poronduwa released in 1982.

He was appointed a Member of the Order of the British Empire (MBE) in 1954 Birthday Honours.

Death
On 25 July 1981, Eddie died from a Heart Attack. During his last days he was residing in 172, Palliyawaththa, Handala. His death was reported by a neighbor, P.K. Piyadasa. He was buried in "Manyokhena" Cemetery in Negombo.

Filmography

Songs
 Thakkita Tharikita Udapana Natanna Hithuna (With Jemini Kanth)
 Kolompure Shriya

References

External links
Eddie Jayamanne's Biography in Sinhala Cinema Database

1915 births
1981 deaths
Sri Lankan male film actors
20th-century Sri Lankan male actors
Sri Lankan Roman Catholics
Sinhalese singers
20th-century Sri Lankan male singers
Ceylonese Members of the Order of the British Empire